Kožlje is a village situated in Novi Pazar municipality of Raška District in Serbia. It is a part of the historical region of Sandžak.

References

Populated places in Raška District